

The Goupy Hydroaeroplane was a floatplane developed by Ambroise Goupy in 1912, which was displayed at the 1912 Paris Aero Salon. It was described in Flight as being generally comparable to a Goupy biplane designed by Alphonse Tellier displayed the year before, except for the change from wheels to a pair of pontoon-style floats. Janes 1913 stated that at least one had been built in 1912, and that the company was producing around 30 a year, but actual production numbers are not known beyond the 1912 demonstrator. An editorial review of the 1913 Paris Aero Salon bemoaned the lack of advancement in Goupy designs, with no display of a seaplane.

Specifications (Hydroaeroplane)

References

Further reading

External links
 Goupy Floatplane, Their Flying Machines, accessed 18 April 2017.

1910s French experimental aircraft
Goupy aircraft
Rotary-engined aircraft
Biplanes